Nina Schultz (born November 12, 1998) is a Chinese track athlete who competes in the heptathlon and pentathlon. She was a Canadian citizen at birth and previously competed for Canada.

Career
Schultz began training in athletics from a young age, and set a junior record in the indoor pentathlon in 2017 prior to being accepted to Kansas State University on a track scholarship. In her debut season in university athletics, Schultz won the bronze medal in the 2017 NCAA Indoor Championships' pentathlon event. At the 2018 NCAA Indoor Championships, she won the silver medal. At the 2018 NCAA Division I Outdoor Track and Field Championships she placed 7th in the heptathlon scoring 5,778 points.

Schultz competed as part of the Canadian team at the 2018 Commonwealth Games in the Gold Coast, Australia. She was the youngest member of the Canadian track and field team. In the heptathlon event, she set a new personal best of 6,133 points and won the silver medal, finishing 122 points behind gold medalist Katarina Johnson-Thompson of England.

Schultz returned to the competitive scene in 2021 under the Chinese flag to increase her personal best by over 200 points at the Spanish leg of the World Athletics Challenge – Combined Events. The athlete, now competing as Ninali Zheng, won the meeting with a score of 6,358 which moved her into qualification for the 2020 Summer Olympics.

Change of citizenship from Canada to China
Schultz became one of a handful of naturalized athletes of China; the athlete served a three year waiting period in compliance of the IAAF competition rules. World Athletics confirmed her eligibility to be a competing member of China's national team on April 12, 2021.

The Chinese press quoted her maternal grandmother Zheng Fengrong, who in 1957 set the women's world record in high jump 1.77m and is a celebrated athlete in China. Her brother Ty Schultz is a hockey player in Canada.

References

External links
  (archive)
 
 
 

1998 births
Living people
Athletes (track and field) at the 2018 Commonwealth Games
Athletes (track and field) at the 2020 Summer Olympics
Chinese heptathletes
Chinese pentathletes
Chinese people of Canadian descent
Commonwealth Games medallists in athletics
Commonwealth Games silver medallists for Canada
Kansas State Wildcats women's track and field athletes
Naturalized citizens of the People's Republic of China
Sportspeople from New Westminster
Olympic athletes of China
Medallists at the 2018 Commonwealth Games